Thomas Cantrell Dugdale  (2 June 1880 – 13 November 1952) was a British artist. He was a member of the Royal Academy, was a renowned portrait painter and served as a war artist in both World War One and World War Two.

Biography

Dugdale was born in Blackburn in Lancashire and attended Manchester Grammar School. He initially studied art at the Manchester School of Art before continuing his studies at the Royal College of Art. He also studied at the City and Guilds of London Art School and in Paris at the Academie Julian and the Académie Colarossi. Dugdale first exhibited at the Royal Academy in 1901 and continued to do so until 1952. In 1910 he enlisted in the British Army and during World War One, Dugdale served as a Staff Sergeant in the Middlesex Yeomanry in Egypt, Palestine and Gallipoli. While on active service Dugdale continued to paint and four of these pieces were acquired by the British War Memorials Committee. A selection of Dugdale's paintings from Palestine and Egypt were shown at the Leicester Galleries in London in April 1919. The Witt Library has a number of political cartoons by Dugdale, possibly dating from around 1914 but it is unclear if, or where, they were intended for publication.

During World War Two, Dugdale lived in Suffolk where he organised a Home Guard unit. Throughout the conflict, from July 1940 to July 1945, Dugdale received portrait commissions from the War Artists' Advisory Committee to depict several merchant seaman and RAF pilots.

In addition to his oil paintings, Dugdale designed book covers and was also a textile designer. Early in his career he designed woodcut decorations for some books. For twenty years, from 1919, Dugdale was an advisor to the textile company Tootal Broadhurst Lee. He was married to a fellow artist, Amy Katherine Browning from 1916.

His work was also part of the art competitions at the 1932 Summer Olympics and the 1948 Summer Olympics.

Memberships
 1910: Member, Royal Institute of Oil Painters
 1925: Member, Royal Society of Portrait Painters
 1936: Elected associate of the Royal Academy,
 1943: Elected full member of the Royal Academy.

References

External links

 
  Works by Dugdale in the Royal Air Force Museum collection
  Works by Dugdale in the Imperial War Museum collection
 
 

1880 births
1952 deaths
20th-century English male artists
20th-century English painters
Académie Colarossi alumni
Alumni of Manchester Metropolitan University
Académie Julian alumni
Alumni of the Royal College of Art
British Army personnel of World War I
British Home Guard soldiers
British war artists
Alumni of the City and Guilds of London Art School
English children's book illustrators
English male painters
English portrait painters
Members of the Royal Institute of Oil Painters
Olympic competitors in art competitions
People educated at Manchester Grammar School
People from Blackburn
Royal Academicians
World War I artists
World War II artists